Benjamin or Ben Clarke may refer to:

Benjamin Clarke (priest) (died 1895), Archdeacon of Liverpool
Ben Clarke (born 1968), rugby player
Ben Clarke (footballer, born 1911) (1911–1981), Northern Irish footballer
 Benjamin Clarke, candidate in the United States gubernatorial elections, 2006

See also
Benjamin Clark (disambiguation)